Mansion of Hidden Souls, called  in Japan, and Yumemi Mystery Mansion in Europe, is an adventure video game released for the Sega CD, developed by System Sacom and published by Sega in Japan and by Vic Tokai in the United States. It has a similar format to other puzzle computer games such as Myst, Uninvited and D. It was first released on December 9, 1993, in the United States and on December 10 in Japan. The PAL version followed soon after in the same month.

A sequel was released in 1994 for the Sega Saturn.

Plot
One night, siblings Johnathan and Samantha come across a butterfly while exploring a grassy field. Enchanted by the butterfly's haunting beauty, Samantha chases after it. Johnathan follows reluctantly, repeating their grandmother's warnings about ghosts who roam the area and turn people into butterflies. The butterfly leads Samantha into a mansion, where she becomes trapped. As Johnathan, the player must explore the mansion, overcome several puzzles, and escape with his sister before the pair of them become permanent residents.

While exploring the mansion, the player encounters several ghosts, who appear in the form of butterflies:
A pampered young girl. She seems friendly at first, but is actually a conniving brat.
An Australian butterfly collector. He seems anxious for the boy to become a butterfly and join the collection.
A painter, who is in a perpetually dreamy, absent-minded state.
An Eastern European tavern wench. She cackles menacingly and seems amused by the children's predicament.
A piano-playing southern belle, who longs to touch the keys again.

Gameplay
The gameplay is very similar to that of D: the player travels between areas via 3D pre-rendered first-person full-motion video sequences, pressing the action button whenever they find something of interest. Doing so, sometimes reveals an important item, such as a key or matchbox, which is added to their inventory. Also like D, the number of actual puzzles is fairly small; the player spends most of the game exploring the mansion and searching for important items.

Reception
The game was met with generally positive reviews. Electronic Gaming Monthly gave it a 7.6 out of 10, calling it "An interesting first-person perspective game with fluid graphics and great sound effects." GamePro described it as a solid The 7th Guest clone, especially praising the use of sound effects to enhance the horror.

Sequel
The Mansion of Hidden Souls, titled  in Japan, is a sequel for the Sega Saturn. The game was developed by System Sacom and published by Sega, and was released in 1994 in Japan, and in 1995 in North America and Europe.

Reception

Compared with the original game, the Saturn sequel was met with negative reviews, as critics found it failed to capture the strong qualities of the original despite being on a more powerful system.

According to Sega Saturn Magazine, the Japanese release of the Saturn game "received a rather lukewarm reception". In a later review of the PAL release, they said that though the graphics are considerably improved from the Sega CD game, the game completely fails to pull off the intended spooky atmosphere, and is also far too easy. GamePro similarly commented that though the Saturn game has better graphics than the Sega CD game, it lacks the tension and eerie atmosphere. In particular, they remarked that the disembodied talking heads of the Saturn game "will make you chuckle instead of cower" and that the music is not as effective. A review in Next Generation was more positive, focusing on the ways in which the game improved the graphics and expanded on the content of the Sega CD original. They concluded "In spite of its shortcomings, Mansion of Hidden Souls remains intriguing and engaging - it's just not a good game for newbies to the genre." Maximum called it "a great-looking game, let down by the linear nature of the adventure".

References

External links

Sega CD Mansion of Hidden Souls screen captures

1993 video games
1990s horror video games
Adventure games
Sega CD games
Sega Saturn games
Sega video games
Single-player video games
System Sacom games
Vic Tokai games
Video games about ghosts
Works set in country houses
Video games developed in Japan